Chiasmocleis leucosticta is a species of frog in the family Microhylidae.
It is endemic to Brazil.
Its natural habitats are subtropical or tropical moist lowland forests and intermittent freshwater marshes.
It is threatened by habitat loss.

References

Chiasmocleis
Endemic fauna of Brazil
Taxonomy articles created by Polbot
Amphibians described in 1888